Linda-Maria Birbeck (born 25 December 1974) is a Swedish director, screenwriter, cinematographer and photographer.

Career 
Birbeck studied film and photography at Amsterdam University of the Arts in the Netherlands. Upon graduation she began working on film and television sets across northern Europe. Birbeck started her career mainly as a Documentary film maker and photographer. Around 2008 she began writing screenplays her first major work was titled Zorro. continued writing screenplays and got into directing around 2011. She directed her first Swedish language feature film Som en Zorro in 2012. The film received positive attention in Sweden and won a best film audience voted award at the 2012 Gothenburg Film Festival. In 2013 she was the head cinematographer for Shed No Tears. In 2015 Birbeck wrote and directed two Swedish language films Hitta Bort and Det borde finnas regler.

In 2016 Birbeck directed Drakhjärta which led to a popular Nordic television show by the same name.

Filmography

Awards and nominations

References

External links 

 
 

1974 births
Living people
Swedish directors
Swedish cinematographers